Ruined is a 2005 EP by San Francisco Bay Area hardcore punk band Ceremony. Released as 7" vinyl by Malfunction Records, Ruined is Ceremony's debut studio release. The seven songs in the EP are also included as bonus tracks in the CD version of 2006's Violence Violence.

Track listing

References

2005 EPs
Ceremony (punk band) albums